Emanoel Vilanez Fernandes de Souza (born December 25, 1982), known as Nei Paraíba is a Brazilian footballer who plays for Mogi Mirim.

Club career
Nei Paraíbajoined Sanat Naft in 2010 after spending the previous season on loan at Guarani Futebol Clube in the Campeonato Brasileiro Série A.

 Assist Goals

References

External sources
 Profile at Persianleague

1982 births
Living people
Brazilian footballers
Brazilian expatriate footballers
Expatriate footballers in Iran
Sanat Naft Abadan F.C. players
Guarani FC players
Oeste Futebol Clube players
Fortaleza Esporte Clube players
Salgueiro Atlético Clube players
Associação Desportiva São Caetano players
Mogi Mirim Esporte Clube players
Association football forwards